Harald Bay is a bay about  wide indenting the coast between Archer Point and Williamson Head in Oates Land, Antarctica. It contains Kartografov Island. The bay was photographed from the air by U.S. Navy Operation Highjump in 1947. It was sketched and photographed by Phillip Law, leader of the Australian National Antarctic Research Expeditions (Magga Dan) on February 20, 1959, and was named by the Antarctic Names Committee of Australia for Captain Harald Moller Pederson, master of the Magga Dan during the expedition.

References

Bays of Antarctica
Bodies of water of Oates Land